Katopuri is a village under a block Jatusana, nearby Rewari city in Rewari district, Haryana, India with an overall population of 1094 (564-Male, 530-Female) including 124 no. of SC/ST people (65-Male, 59-Female) with 7 electoral wards and 2 Anganvadis. The nearby railway station is Jatusana 7 km from village and recently opened and started railway station at Village Palhawas.

Sunil sarpanch 9416414965

Gallery

References

Cities and towns in Rewari district
Villages in Rewari district